L'île de Merlin, ou Le monde renversé (Merlin's Island, or the World Upended) is an opéra comique in one act composed by Christoph Willibald Gluck to a 1753 French libretto by Louis Anseaume based on Alain René Lesage and D'Orneval's 1718 vaudeville comedy Le monde renversé. Gluck's version was first performed on 3 October 1758 at the Schönbrunn Palace in Vienna.

Roles

References

External links
 Anseaume's 1753 revised French libretto for Le monde renversé at Google Books

1758 operas
French-language operas
One-act operas
Operas by Christoph Willibald Gluck
Operas
Arthurian operas